Samayac is a town and municipality in the Suchitepéquez department of Guatemala. It lies at an elevation of 615 metres above sea level and covers an area of 24.3 km².

References

External links
Muni in Spanish

Municipalities of the Suchitepéquez Department